Acrimeroceras is an oxyconic Devonian goniatite and one of three genera included in the subfamily Paratornoceratinae. The others being  Paratornoceras and  Paratoceras or ex Polonites.

Acrimeroceras has a shell like that of Paratornoceras with biconvex growth lines and constrictions and simple dorsal lobe. The adult shell is extremely compressed, smooth, oxyconic to lanceolate in section. Early growth stages are depressed, subglobular, smooth or ribbed, with an open umbilicus and rounded to suboxyconic venter, which sharpens relatively early during ontogeny.  Sutural elements in general are broadly rounded except for the lateral lobe which is pointed and asymmetric.

References
 Morphometric Analyses and Taxonomy of Oxyconic Goniatites (Paratornoceratinae n. subfam) from the Early Famennean Tafilalt of the (Anti-Atlas, Morocco) in Proceedings of the Geological Survey, 57, Vienna, 2002.
 Acrimeroceras in Goniat Taxonomy
 Acrimeroceras- Paleodb
 Miller, Furnish, and Schindewolf. Paleozoic Ammonoidea. Treatise on Invertebrate Paleontology, Part L. R.C. Moore (Ed). Geological Society of America, 1957.

Dimeroceratidae
Goniatitida genera
Fossils of Morocco